Hammersmith is a district of London. It can also refer to:

Hammersmith (UK Parliament constituency)
London Borough of Hammersmith and Fulham, a borough in London
Metropolitan Borough of Hammersmith, a former borough in London
Hammersmith tube station (Circle and Hammersmith & City lines)
Hammersmith tube station (District and Piccadilly lines)
Hammersmith (Grove Road) railway station, closed in 1916
Hammersmith (band), a Canadian rock band
Hammersmith, Derbyshire, an area of Ripley, Derbyshire, England
a composition by Gustav Holst
Jerome Hammersmith (1938-2021), Canadian politician
Saugus Iron Works National Historic Site, a US colonial iron works